L'ingenua is a 1975 Italian commedia sexy all'italiana and road movie directed by Gianfranco Baldanello. The film featured Ilona Staller in her first lead role and shared an almost identical essential cast and filming locations with the earlier Armando Bertuccioli film La nipote.

Plot
Piero Spazin (George Ardisson) is a con artist who meets his friend Luigi Beton (Daniele Vargas), a fraudster, and the two get engaged in a new fraud scheme, also attempting to trick each other at the same time. Angela (Staller), a supposedly naïve employee of Piero's fiancée Augusta (Anna Maria Pescatori) becomes accidentally involved in their plan and agrees to accompany them on their journey. However, joining of Susy (Orchidea De Santis), another con artist to the group after meeting Luigi's son Rodolfo (Graziano Chiaro) makes things even more complicated.

Cast 
 Ilona Staller: Angela
 George Ardisson: Piero Spazin
 Daniele Vargas: Luigi Beton
 Anna Maria Pescatori: Augusta Bortolon
 Orchidea De Santis: Susy
 Graziano Chiaro: Rodolfo
 Ezio Marano: Cornelio
 Otello Cazzola: Augusta's father
 Antonia Cazzola: Cornelio's mother
 Patrizia Bilardo: Cornelio's wife
 Achille Grioni: the priest
 Enzo Spitaleri: the notary

References

External links

1975 films
Italian erotic drama films
Commedia sexy all'italiana
Italian road movies
1970s drama road movies
Films directed by Gianfranco Baldanello
1970s sex comedy films
1975 comedy films
1975 drama films
1970s Italian films